McKeough is a surname. Notable people with this surname include:

People
Darcy McKeough (born 1933), Canadian politician and businessman
Dave McKeough (1863–1901), American baseball player
Patrick McKeough (born ?), Canadian publisher, editor, author, and businessman
Raymond S. McKeough (1888–1979), American politician
Rita McKeough (born 1951), Canadian interdisciplinary artist, musician, and educator
Stefanie McKeough (born 1991), Canadian ice hockey player

See also
Tom MacKeough (1922–1990), Canadian politician
Kehoe (disambiguation)
Keogh (disambiguation)
Keoghan (surname)
Keohane (disambiguation)
Keough (disambiguation)
McKeogh, a surname